David Braid (born 25 March 1975 in Hamilton, Ontario) is a Canadian composer and pianist specializing in jazz.

Biography
Canadian composer and jazz pianist, David Braid, is "considered one of his country's true renaissance men when it comes to music." (The Ottawa Citizen)

After graduating from the University of Toronto in 1998, Steinway Artist David Braid focused his career performing original music.  He formed the "David Braid Sextet" in 1999 with John MacLeod on trumpet; Mike Murley on saxophone; Gene Smith on trombone, Steve Wallace on bass, and Terry Clarke on drums.  This band made three albums, with the second one, "Vivid: The David Braid Sextet Live" winning the Juno Award for Traditional Jazz Album of the Year at the Juno Awards of 2005.  His albums Mnemosyne's March, Zhen: The David Braid Sextet Live Vol II, Brubeck Braid, Spirit Dance, Flow, have also been nominated for Juno Awards. In 2017, Braid won two Screen Awards,  "Best Original Score" and "Best Original Song" for his work on the flm, Born to Be Blue. In 2018, his album "The North" won a Juno Award for Best Jazz Album (Group). His first classical work, Corona Divinae Misericordiae, was nominated for a 2019 Juno Award for Best Classical Album (Choral or Vocal.)

Although Braid developed a reputation as one of the country's most celebrated jazz players, he began moving in a different direction with a solo piano album of original compositions called, "Verge." Braid's 2011 solo piano album, Verge, also won a Juno award for Traditional Jazz Album of the Year.

In 2014, Braid became a Special Associate Artist of Sinfonia UK Collective In summer 2015 he toured with the group in the UK and Canada as part of a project funded by Arts Council England / National Lottery and University of Hull. Braid's approach to work with Sinfonia UK Collective was the focus of a paper on democratic authorship that was presented at the Reflective Conservatoire Conference in February 2015 (Guildhall School of Music and Drama). In that paper, Dr Lee Tsang offered models of democratic authorship and used Braid's work as an example of one of a number of approaches that the Sinfonia UK Collective (formerly Hull Sinfonietta) had undertaken since 2004.

In addition to his collaboration with Sinfonia UK Collective, Braid moved further afield from his jazz roots with his 2016 release "FLOW: David Braid + Epoque String Quartet" on the Steinway & Sons record label. David Braid is also the recipient of the Paul de Hueck and Norman Walford Career Achievement Award for Keyboard Artistry (2016)

Tsang has been a close collaborator, as conductor, baritone and writer of original texts. His involvement with Braid's work includes writing liner notes for the FLOW album, and developing original texts for songs such as Red Hero Cantata, 'Air', 'Nirvana.Lumiere.' 'The Hand' (as featured on the Twisting Ways album). He wrote the words for the semi-dramatic work 'Nine Dragons Fantasy'. He was also a producer on Braid's Corona Divinae Misericordiae album, having been involved as conductor during the work's developmental process. He conducted Resolute Bay which Braid wrote for him and his orchestra, which can be seen here at Braid's Steinway Artist launch concert in Toronto 2015.David Braid's Resolute Bay with Sinfonia UK Collective conducted by Lee Tsang

Discography

Film scores
Dream Recording (2003)
Photographic Fate (2004)
China Gate (2011)
Born to Be Blue (2015)
Weaving (2017)
Delia's Gone (2022)

References

External links

1975 births
Canadian jazz pianists
Canadian jazz composers
Male jazz composers
Musicians from Hamilton, Ontario
University of Toronto alumni
Living people
Best Original Score Genie and Canadian Screen Award winners
Best Original Song Genie and Canadian Screen Award winners
Juno Award for Traditional Jazz Album of the Year winners
Canadian male pianists
21st-century Canadian pianists
21st-century Canadian male musicians